Maxime Defert (born May 11, 1944, dead  September 12, 2020) is a French artist, whose works comprise Geometric composition paintings on canvas and paper.

References

External links 
 Find works of art, auction results & sale prices of artist Maxime Defert at galleries and auctions worldwide
 auction results & sale prices of artist Maxime Defert  (1944 - )

1944 births
Living people
20th-century French painters
French male painters
21st-century French painters
21st-century French male artists
People from Avallon